Konstantin Nikolayevich Igumnov (1873 – March 24, 1948) was a Soviet and Russian pianist and pedagogue. People's Artist of the USSR (1946).

Biography
Igumnov studied under Nikolai Zverev, and at Moscow Conservatory under Alexander Siloti and Pavel Pabst. He took theory and composition courses from Sergei Taneyev, Anton Arensky and Mikhail Ippolitov-Ivanov. In 1898-9 he was pianoforte teacher at the Tiflis music-school of the Russian Musical Society. From 1899 he was Professor at the Moscow Conservatory, where his life's work was carried out. He recorded 6 pieces on piano roll for the Welte-Mignon reproducing piano in 1910.

Among his many students were Arno Babajanian, Bolesław Kon, Naum Shtarkman, Elena Beckman-Shcherbina, Yakov Flier, Boris Berlin, Lev Oborin, Maria Grinberg, Andrzej Wasowski, Elena Laumenskienė, Ryszard Bakst, Tengiz Amirejibi, Anatoly Alexandrov, Bella Davidovich, Rosa Tamarkina, Issay Dobrowen, and Mariya Gambaryan.

Igumnov was evacuated to Yerevan, Armenia during the first half of 1940s. During those years he was teaching at the local Conservatory, where his 70th anniversary was widely celebrated.

A four-record (LP) set of Igumnov's recordings was issued by Melodiya on 33C 10-05519-26.

Honours and awards
 Order of the Red Banner of Labour (1937)
 People's Artist of the RSFSR (1941)
 Order of Lenin (1945)
 People's Artist of the USSR (1946)
 Stalin Prize (1946)
 Medal "For Valiant Labour in the Great Patriotic War 1941–1945"
 Medal "In Commemoration of the 800th Anniversary of Moscow"

Welte-Mignon Piano Rolls
Catalog no. 2061: Rachmaninoff - Prelude, Op. 23, No. 1, f# 
Catalog no. 2062: Rachmaninoff - Prelude, Op. 23, No. 6, Eb
Catalog no. 2063: Scriabin - Sonata-Fantasie, Op. 19, No. 2, g#
Catalog no. 2064: Brahms - Intermezzo, Op. 118, No. 6, eb
Catalog no. 2065: Rachmaninoff - "Fantasy Pieces", Op. 3, No. 2, c#: Prelude
Catalog no. 2066: Arensky - By the Seashore, Op. 52, No. 4, Gb

Sources
A. Eaglefield-Hull, A Dictionary of Modern Music and Musicians (Dent, London 1924).
J. Methuen-Campbell, Chopin Playing from the Composer to the Present Day (Gollancz, London 1981).

References

1873 births
1948 deaths
Soviet classical pianists

People from Lebedyansky Uyezd
People from Lipetsk Oblast
Academic staff of Moscow Conservatory
Moscow Conservatory alumni
People's Artists of the RSFSR
People's Artists of the USSR
Stalin Prize winners
Recipients of the Order of Lenin
Recipients of the Order of the Red Banner of Labour
Classical pianists from the Russian Empire
Male classical pianists
Pupils of Nikolai Zverev
Pupils of Pavel Pabst
Burials at Novodevichy Cemetery